Boettgeria obesiuscula is a species of small, very elongate, air-breathing land snails, terrestrial pulmonate gastropod mollusks in the family Clausiliidae, the door snails, all of which have a clausilium.

This species is endemic to Portugal.

References

Molluscs of Europe
Boettgeria
Taxonomy articles created by Polbot
Gastropods described in 1863